Honeysuckle Weeks is the second full length studio album by Indie pop band The Submarines. It was released through iTunes on April 15, 2008, and was released physically on May 13, 2008.  The album was released through Canadian label Nettwerk.

Background
The album was named after the eponymous actress, Blake Hazard told Indy Weeks Chris Parker: "We mostly wrote and recorded the album over the course of last summer, so it was kind of the honeysuckle weeks, though it's actually the name of a British actress. We just saw her name in the credits one night from something we were watching and thought it was the most charming name ever. And it kind of reflects the summery feeling we were having".

An instrumental cut of "You, Me and the Bourgeoisie" is used in the worldwide commercials for Apple's iPhone 3G. Apple also used "Submarine Symphonika" in their iPhone 3GS commercials. "Submarine Symphonika" also uses audio from the Swedish Rhapsody Numbers Station, found on The Conet Project.

The song "Xavia" is also included on the soundtrack to the film Nick and Norah's Infinite Playlist. "Maybe" was used for the Season 2 finale of The Good Place.

Track listing

Personnel

Musicians
 John Dragonetti – primary artist, engineer, mixing
 Blake Hazard – primary artist
 Daphne Chen – cello
 Richard Dodd – cello
 Eric Gorfain – arranger, violin

Production
 Paul DuGre – engineer
 Jeff Lipton – mastering

References

External links 
 Official band website
 Official record label website

2008 albums
The Submarines albums
Nettwerk Records albums